Ode to Io is the first full-length album from Lowrider, released on Meteor City.

Controversial upon its release for its dangerous similarity to stoner rock godfathers Kyuss, it has since developed a strong cult following after the band disbanded in 2003. It is currently out of print.

Track listing
 "Caravan" - 3:30 (Bergstrand)
 "Flat Earth" - 5:35 (Bergstrand)
 "Convoy V" - 5:14 (Bergstrand)
 "Dust Settlin'" - 5:04 (Bergstrand)
 "Sun Devil" - 1:15 (Hellquist)
 "Anchor" - 5:38 (Bergstrand/Hellquist)
 "Texas Pt I & II" - 7:34 (Bergstrand/Hellquist)
 "Riding Shotgun" - 6:06 (Bergstrand)
 "Saguaro" - 5:20 (Bergstrand/Hellquist)
 "Ode to Io" - 7:15 (Bergstrand)

Personnel
Andreas Eriksson - Drums
Peder Bergstrand - Basses, Vocals
Niclas Stalfors - Guitars
Ola Hellquist - Lead Guitars, Vocals

Credits
Recorded  at KM Studios Karlskoga Sweden

The 1st & 3rd week of November 1999

Mixed & Mastered at KM Studios by Andreas Eriksson 2000

Album Photos by Daniel Onnerlov

Cutout Illustrations by Anatol Bolanowski

Cover Concept & Layout by Karate Kommando

Lyrics: Bergstrand/Stalfors/Hellquist/Eriksson

Opening Riff on Track 2 by Felix Daneken Jr.

References

2000 debut albums
Lowrider (Swedish band) albums
MeteorCity albums